Daniel Douglas Sabin from Danvers, Massachusetts, USA was named Fellow of the Institute of Electrical and Electronics Engineers (IEEE) in 2016 for leadership in power quality database management and analysis software. He was a principal engineer with Electrotek Concepts when he was elevated to Fellow.

Sabin's research focused on developing automatic computer software to combine measurements from power quality monitors & microprocessor relays, distribution circuit models, and geographic information system (GIS) to provide automatic fault location based on reactance calculations.

Sabin chaired the IEEE Standards Coordinating Committee on Power Quality (SCC-22) from 2008 to 2009. This committee is responsible for coordinating IEEE activities related to the quality of electric power as it affects power equipment, power consumers, electric utilities, electric power systems, and telecommunications systems.

From 2017 to 2018, Sabin chaired the Transmission & Distribution Committee of the IEEE Power & Energy Society (PES). This committee's scope within IEEE focuses on power capacitors, passive harmonic filters, electric power distribution, HVDC, FACTS, power quality, dynamic voltage restoration (DVR) technology, and overhead line design, construction, design, & safety.

In 2018, he received the IEEE PES Award for Excellence in Power Distribution Engineering for contributions in power quality monitoring and related indicators for fault location in distributions systems.

In 2020, Sabin was with Schneider Electric and was the chair of the IEEE PES Working Group on Power Quality Data Interchange Format (PQDIF).

References 

Fellow Members of the IEEE
Living people
Year of birth missing (living people)
American electrical engineers